The (Roman Catholic) Diocese of Chanthaburi (Dioecesis Chanthaburiensis, Thai: สังฆมณฑลจันทบุรี) is located in eastern central Thailand. It is a suffragan diocese of the archdiocese of Bangkok.

The diocese covers an area of 34,000 km2, covering the provinces - Chanthaburi, Chonburi, Prachinburi, Rayong, Sa Kaeo and Trat, as well as the parts east of the Bang Pa Kong River in Chachoengsao, and Nakhon Nayok except the district Ban Na.

As of 2009, of the 4.4 million citizens 38,918 are member of the Catholic Church. It is divided into 42 parishes, having 112 priests altogether.

History
On May 11, 1944 the Vicariate Apostolic of Chantaburi was split off from the Vicariate Apostolic of Bangkok. On December 18, 1965 it was elevated to a diocese.

Cathedral

The Cathedral of the Immaculate Conception (Thai: อาสนวิหารพระนางมารีอาปฏิสนธินิรมล)  is the largest church of Thailand. A first missionary chapel was built at the site in 1711. After being enlarged and rebuilt four times  during the nineteenth century, especially due to the immigration of Vietnamese Christian fleeing religious persecution in the home country. In 1909 it was rebuilt in its current Gothic style. It is located at the Chanthanimit Road on the left bank of the Chanthaburi River. During World War II the spires were taken down to make the church a less obvious navigational aid to allied bombers; they have since been replaced.

Bishops

Giacomo Luigi Cheng: May 11, 1944 - April 14, 1952
Francis Xavier Sanguon Souvannasri: January 8, 1953  - April 3, 1970 (Resigned)
Lawrence Thienchai Samanchit: July 3, 1971 - April 4, 2009
Silvio Siripong Charatsri: appointed April 4, 2009
Before the vicariate apostolic was elevated to a diocese, the bishops were assigned a titular see.

See also
Roman Catholicism in Thailand

References

External links
Website of the diocese
catholic-hierarchy.org 

Chanthaburi
Chanthaburi
Chanthaburi